Noel Raitt (born 26 December 1943) is a former Australian rules footballer who played for Essendon in the Victorian Football League (VFL) during the 1960s.

Raitt, a half forward who could also play as a ruckman or defender, spent just two seasons at Essendon. He was appointed captain-coach of North West Football Union club East Devonport in 1965 and remained in that role for three years. After a stint as captain-coach of Koroit and a couple of years playing in Port Moresby, Raitt returned to his original club Stawell for the 1973 season.

He was also a Tasmanian interstate representative and appeared in the 1966 Hobart Carnival.

References

Holmesby, Russell and Main, Jim (2007). The Encyclopedia of AFL Footballers. 7th ed. Melbourne: Bas Publishing.

1943 births
Living people
Essendon Football Club players
East Devonport Football Club players
Stawell Football Club players
Koroit Football Club players
Australian rules footballers from Victoria (Australia)